Christian Roberto López Contreras (born September 5, 1987) is a retired Mexican professional footballer who played as a defender for U. de G. of Ascenso MX.

External links
 
 

Living people
1987 births
Mexican footballers
Association football defenders
Leones Negros UdeG footballers
Ascenso MX players
Liga Premier de México players
Tercera División de México players
Footballers from Guadalajara, Jalisco